The , referred to at the time as the , and also known as the Meiji Renovation, Revolution, Regeneration, Reform, or Renewal, was a political event that restored practical imperial rule to Japan in 1868 under Emperor Meiji. Although there were ruling emperors before the Meiji Restoration, the events restored practical abilities and consolidated the political system under the Emperor of Japan. The goals of the restored government were expressed by the new emperor in the Charter Oath.

The Restoration led to enormous changes in Japan's political and social structure and spanned both the late Edo period (often called the Bakumatsu) and the beginning of the Meiji era, during which time Japan rapidly industrialized and adopted Western ideas and production methods.

Foreign influence 
The Japanese knew they were behind the Western powers when US Commodore Matthew C. Perry came to Japan in 1853 in large warships with armaments and technology that far outclassed those of Japan, with the intent to conclude a treaty that would open up Japanese ports to trade. Figures like Shimazu Nariakira concluded that "if we take the initiative, we can dominate; if we do not, we will be dominated", leading Japan to "throw open its doors to foreign technology." 

The leaders of the Meiji Restoration, as this revolution came to be known, acted in the name of restoring imperial rule to strengthen Japan against the threat of being colonized, bringing to an end the era known as sakoku (the foreign relations policy, lasting about 250 years, prescribing the death penalty for foreigners entering or Japanese nationals leaving the country). The word "Meiji" means "enlightened rule" and the goal was to combine "modern advances" with traditional "eastern" values. The main leaders of this were Itō Hirobumi, Matsukata Masayoshi, Kido Takayoshi, Itagaki Taisuke, Yamagata Aritomo, Mori Arinori, Ōkubo Toshimichi, and Yamaguchi Naoyoshi.

Imperial restoration 
The foundation of the Meiji Restoration was the 1866 Satsuma-Chōshū Alliance between Saigō Takamori and Kido Takayoshi, leaders of the reformist elements in the Satsuma and Chōshū Domains at the southwestern end of the Japanese archipelago. These two leaders supported the Emperor Kōmei (Emperor Meiji's father) and were brought together by Sakamoto Ryōma for the purpose of challenging the ruling Tokugawa shogunate (bakufu) and restoring the Emperor to power. After Kōmei's death on 30 January 1867, Meiji ascended the throne on February3. This period also saw Japan change from being a feudal society to having a market economy and left the Japanese with a lingering influence of Modernity.

In the same year, the koban was discontinued as a form of currency.

End of the Tokugawa shogunate 

The Tokugawa government had been founded in the 17th century and initially focused on reestablishing order in social, political and international affairs after a century of warfare. The political structure, established by Tokugawa Ieyasu and solidified under his two immediate successors, his son Tokugawa Hidetada (who ruled from 1616 to 1623) and grandson Tokugawa Iemitsu (1623–51), bound all daimyōs to the shogunate and limited any individual daimyō from acquiring too much land or power. The Tokugawa shogunate came to its official end on 9November 1867, when Tokugawa Yoshinobu, the 15th Tokugawa shōgun, "put his prerogatives at the Emperor's disposal" and resigned 10 days later. This was effectively the "restoration" (Taisei Hōkan) of imperial rule – although Yoshinobu still had significant influence and it was not until January3, the following year, with the young Emperor's edict, that the restoration fully occurred. On 3 January 1868, the Emperor stripped Yoshinobu of all power and made a formal declaration of the restoration of his power:

Shortly thereafter in January 1868, the Boshin War started with the Battle of Toba–Fushimi in which Chōshū and Satsuma's forces defeated the ex-shōguns army. All Tokugawa lands were seized and placed under "imperial control", thus placing them under the prerogative of the new Meiji government. With Fuhanken sanchisei, the areas were split into three types: ,  and the already existing domains.

On March 23 the Dutch Minister-Resident Dirk de Graeff van Polsbroek and the French Minister-Resident Léon Roches were the first European envoys ever to receive a personal audience with Meiji in Edo (Tokyo). This audience laid the foundation for (modern) Dutch diplomacy in Japan. Subsequently, De Graeff van Polsbroek assisted the emperor and the government in their negotiations with representatives of the major European powers.

In 1869, the daimyōs of the Tosa, Hizen, Satsuma and Chōshū Domains, who were pushing most fiercely against the shogunate, were persuaded to "return their domains to the Emperor". Other daimyō were subsequently persuaded to do so, thus creating a central government in Japan which exercised direct power through the entire "realm".

Some shogunate forces escaped to Hokkaidō, where they attempted to set up a breakaway Republic of Ezo; however, forces loyal to the Emperor ended this attempt in May 1869 with the Battle of Hakodate in Hokkaidō. The defeat of the armies of the former shōgun (led by Enomoto Takeaki and Hijikata Toshizō) marked the final end of the Tokugawa shogunate, with the Emperor's power fully restored.

Finally, by 1872, the daimyōs, past and present, were summoned before the Emperor, where it was declared that all domains were now to be returned to the Emperor. The roughly 280 domains were turned into 72 prefectures, each under the control of a state-appointed governor. If the daimyōs peacefully complied, they were given a prominent voice in the new Meiji government. Later, their debts and payments of samurai stipends were either taxed heavily or turned into bonds which resulted in a large loss of wealth among former samurai.

Military reform 

Emperor Meiji announced in his 1868 Charter Oath that "Knowledge shall be sought all over the world, and thereby the foundations of imperial rule shall be strengthened."

Under the leadership of Mori Arinori, a group of prominent Japanese intellectuals went on to form the Meiji Six Society in 1873 to continue to "promote civilization and enlightenment" through modern ethics and ideas. However, during the restoration, political power simply moved from the Tokugawa shogunate to an oligarchy consisting of these leaders, mostly from Satsuma Province (Ōkubo Toshimichi and Saigō Takamori), and Chōshū Province (Itō Hirobumi, Yamagata Aritomo, and Kido Takayoshi). This reflected their belief in the more traditional practice of imperial rule, whereby the Emperor of Japan serves solely as the spiritual authority of the nation and his ministers govern the nation in his name.

The Meiji oligarchy that formed the government under the rule of the Emperor first introduced measures to consolidate their power against the remnants of the Edo period government, the shogunate, daimyōs, and the samurai class. The oligarchs also endeavored to abolish the four divisions of society.

Throughout Japan at the time, the samurai numbered 1.9 million. For comparison, this was more than 10 times the size of the French privileged class before the 1789 French Revolution. Moreover, the samurai in Japan were not merely the lords, but also their higher retainers—people who actually worked. With each samurai being paid fixed stipends, their upkeep presented a tremendous financial burden, which may have prompted the oligarchs to action.

Whatever their true intentions, the oligarchs embarked on another slow and deliberate process to abolish the samurai class. First, in 1873, it was announced that the samurai stipends were to be taxed on a rolling basis. Later, in 1874, the samurai were given the option to convert their stipends into government bonds. Finally, in 1876, this commutation was made compulsory.

To reform the military, the government instituted nationwide conscription in 1873, mandating that every male would serve for four years in the armed forces upon turning 21 years old, followed by three more years in the reserves. One of the primary differences between the samurai and peasant classes was the right to bear arms; this ancient privilege was suddenly extended to every male in the nation. Furthermore, samurai were no longer allowed to walk about town bearing a sword or weapon to show their status.

This led to a series of riots from disgruntled samurai. One of the major riots was the one led by Saigō Takamori, the Satsuma Rebellion, which eventually turned into a civil war. This rebellion was, however, put down swiftly by the newly formed Imperial Japanese Army, trained in Western tactics and weapons, even though the core of the new army was the Tokyo police force, which was largely composed of former samurai. This sent a strong message to the dissenting samurai that their time was indeed over. There were fewer subsequent samurai uprisings and the distinction became all but a name as the samurai joined the new society. The ideal of samurai military spirit lived on in romanticized form and was often used as propaganda during the early 20th-century wars of the Empire of Japan.

However, it is equally true that the majority of samurai were content despite having their status abolished. Many found employment in the government bureaucracy, which resembled an elite class in its own right. The samurai, being better educated than most of the population, became teachers, gun makers, government officials, and/or military officers. While the formal title of samurai was abolished, the elitist spirit that characterized the samurai class lived on.

The oligarchs also embarked on a series of land reforms. In particular, they legitimized the tenancy system which had been going on during the Tokugawa period. Despite the bakufu's best efforts to freeze the four classes of society in place, during their rule villagers had begun to lease land out to other farmers, becoming rich in the process. This greatly disrupted the clearly defined class system which the bakufu had envisaged, partly leading to their eventual downfall.

The military of Japan, strengthened by nationwide conscription and emboldened by military success in both the Sino-Japanese War and the Russo-Japanese War, began to view themselves as a growing world power.

Centralization 

Besides drastic changes to the social structure of Japan, in an attempt to create a strong centralized state defining its national identity, the government established a dominant national dialect, called , that replaced local and regional dialects and was based on the patterns of Tokyo's samurai classes. This dialect eventually became the norm in the realms of education, media, government, and business.

The Meiji Restoration, and the resultant modernization of Japan, also influenced Japanese self-identity with respect to its Asian neighbours, as Japan became the first Asian state to modernize based on the Western model, replacing the traditional Confucian hierarchical order that had persisted previously under a dominant China with one based on modernity.
Adopting enlightenment ideals of popular education, the Japanese government established a national system of public schools. These free schools taught students reading, writing, and mathematics. Students also attended courses in "moral training" which reinforced their duty to the Emperor and to the Japanese state. By the end of the Meiji period, attendance of public schools was widespread, increasing the availability of skilled workers and contributing to the industrial growth of Japan.

The opening up of Japan not only consisted of the ports being opened for trade, but also began the process of merging members of the different societies together. Examples of this include western teachers and advisors immigrating to Japan and also Japanese nationals moving to western countries for education purposes. All of these things in turn played a part in expanding the people of Japan's knowledge on western customs, technology and institutions. Many people believed it was essential for Japan to acquire western 'spirit' in order to become a great nation with strong trade routes and military strength.

Industrial growth 

During the Meiji period, powers such as Europe and the United States helped transform Japan and made them realize a change needed to take place. Some leaders went out to foreign lands and used the knowledge and government writings to help shape and form a more influential government within their walls that allowed for things such as production. Despite the help Japan received from other powers, one of the key factors in Japan's industrializing success was its relative lack of resources, which made it unattractive to Western imperialism. The farmer and the samurai classification were the base and soon the problem of why there was a limit of growth within the nation's industrial work. The government sent officials such as the samurai to monitor the work that was being done. Because of Japan's leaders taking control and adapting Western techniques it has remained one of the world's largest industrial nations.

The rapid industrialization and modernization of Japan both allowed and required a massive increase in production and infrastructure. Japan built industries such as shipyards, iron smelters, and spinning mills, which were then sold to well-connected entrepreneurs. Consequently, domestic companies became consumers of Western technology and applied it to produce items that would be sold cheaply in the international market. With this, industrial zones grew enormously, and there was a massive migration to industrializing centers from the countryside. Industrialization additionally went hand in hand with the development of a national railway system and modern communications.

With industrialization came the demand for coal. There was dramatic rise in production, as shown in the table below.

Coal was needed for steamships and railroads. The growth of these sectors is shown below.

Destruction of cultural heritage
The majority of Japanese castles were smashed and destroyed in the late 19th century in the Meiji restoration by the Japanese people and government in order to modernize and westernize Japan and break from their past feudal era of the Daimyo and Shoguns. It was only due to the 1964 Summer Olympics in Japan that cheap concrete replicas of those castles were  built for tourists. The vast majority of castles in Japan today are new replicas made out of concrete. In 1959 a concrete keep was built for Nagoya castle.

During the Meiji restoration's Shinbutsu bunri, tens of thousands of Japanese Buddhist religious idols and temples were smashed and destroyed. Japan then closed and shut down tens of thousands of traditional old Shinto shrines in the Shrine Consolidation Policy and the Meiji government built the new modern 15 shrines of the Kenmu restoration as a political move to link the Meiji restoration to the Kenmu restoration for their new State Shinto cult.

Outlawing of traditional practices
In the Blood tax riots, the Meiji government put down revolts by Japanese samurai angry that the traditional untouchable status of burakumin was legally revoked.

With the Dampatsurei Edict of 1871 issued by Emperor Meiji during the early Meiji Era, men of the samurai classes were forced to cut their hair short, effectively abandoning the chonmage hairstyle.

During the Meiji Restoration, the practice of cremation and Buddhism were condemned and the Japanese government tried to ban cremation but were unsuccessful, then tried to limit it in urban areas. The Japanese government reversed its ban on cremation and pro-cremation Japanese adopted western European arguments on how cremation was good for limiting disease spread, so the Japanese government lifted their attempted ban in May 1875 and promoted cremation for diseased people in 1897.

Use of foreign specialists

Even before the Meiji Restoration, the Tokugawa Shogunate government hired German diplomat Philipp Franz von Siebold as diplomatic advisor, Dutch naval engineer Hendrik Hardes for Nagasaki Arsenal and Willem Johan Cornelis, Ridder Huijssen van Kattendijke for Nagasaki Naval Training Center, French naval engineer François Léonce Verny for Yokosuka Naval Arsenal, and British civil engineer Richard Henry Brunton. Most of them were appointed through government approval with two or three years contract, and took their responsibility properly in Japan, except some cases. Then many other foreign specialists were hired. 

Despite the value they provided in the modernization of Japan, the Japanese government did not consider it prudent for them to settle in Japan permanently. After the contract terminated, most of them returned to their country except some, like Josiah Conder and William Kinninmond Burton.

See also 
 Bakumatsu
 Datsu-A Ron
 Four Hitokiri of the Bakumatsu
 Land Tax Reform (Japan 1873)
 Modernization of Japanese Military 1868–1931
 Meiji Constitution

Explanatory notes 
1. Although the political system was consolidated under the Emperor, power was mainly transferred to a group of people, known as the Meiji oligarchy (and Genrō), who helped in the restoration of imperial power.
2.At that time, the new government used the phrase "Itten-banjō" (一天万乗). However, the more generic term 天下 is most commonly used in modern historiography.

References

Further reading 
 
 
 
 Breen, John, "The Imperial Oath of April 1868: ritual, power and politics in Restoration Japan", Monumenta Nipponica, 51,4 (1996)
 
 Earl, David M. Emperor and Nation in Japan (Seattle: University of Washington Press, 1972), on Yoshida: "Attitude toward the Emperor/Nation", pp 161–192. Also pp. 82–105.
 Harry D. Harootunian, Toward Restoration (Berkeley: University of California Press, 1970), "Introduction", pp. 1–46; on Yoshida: chapter IV "The Culture of Action – Yoshida Shōin", pp. 184–219.
 
 Jansen, Marius B. (1961). Sakamoto Ryōma and the Meiji Restoration. Princeton: Princeton University Press. . Especially chapter VIII: "Restoration".
 Jansen, Marius B.: "The Meiji Restoration", in: Jansen, Marius B. (ed.): The Cambridge history of Japan, Volume 5: The nineteenth century (New York: Cambridge UP, 1989), pp. 308–366.
 
 
 McAleavy, Henry. "The Meiji Restoration" History Today (Sept. 1958) 8#9 pp. 634–645
 McAleavy, Henry. "The Making of Modern Japan" History Today (May 1959) 9#5 pp 297–30
 
 
 Strayer, Robert W. (2013). Ways of the World with Sources Vol. 2 (2nd ed.), pp 950(?).
 Najita Tetsuo, The Intellectual Foundations of Modern Japanese Politics (Chicago & London: University of Chicago Press), chapter 3: "Restorationism in Late Tokugawa", pp 43 – 68.
 Totman, Conrad (1988). "From Reformism to Transformism, bakufu Policy 1853–1868", in: T. Najita & V. J. Koshmann, Conflict in Modern Japanese History (New Jersey: Princeton University Press), pp. 62 – 80.

External links 
 Essay on The Meiji Restoration Era, 1868–1889 on the About Japan, A Teacher's Resource website
 A rare collection of Japanese Photographs of the Meiji Restoration from famous 19th-century Japanese and European photographers

 
1860s in Japan
1868 establishments in Japan
Japanese governmental reforms
Meiji period